Luc Choley (born 2 June 1959) is a French sailor. He competed at the 1984 Summer Olympics and the 1988 Summer Olympics.

References

External links
 

1959 births
Living people
French male sailors (sport)
Olympic sailors of France
Sailors at the 1984 Summer Olympics – Finn
Sailors at the 1988 Summer Olympics – Finn
People from Malakoff
20th-century French people